Ledio Beqja (born 18 June 2001) is an Albanian professional footballer who currently play as a central midfielder for Albanian club Teuta.

References

2001 births
Living people
People from Castiglione del Lago
Albanian footballers
Albania youth international footballers
Italian footballers
Italian people of Albanian descent
Association football midfielders
Kategoria Superiore players
KF Teuta Durrës players
Sportspeople from the Province of Perugia
Footballers from Umbria